Amycolatopsis alba is a bacterium from the genus of Amycolatopsis which has been isolated from soil. The strain DSM 44262 of Amycolatopsis alba produces sesquiterpenes and ansamycins.

References

Pseudonocardiales
Bacteria described in 1993